Nyoma pusilla is a species of beetle in the family Cerambycidae. It was described by Breuning in 1943, originally under the genus Sophroniella.

References

Desmiphorini
Beetles described in 1943